Trieste is a city in Italy.

Trieste may also refer to:

Places
 Trieste (Rome), a district of Rome
 Free Territory of Trieste, a free state that existed between 1945 and 1954 (formally until 1977)
 Imperial Free City of Trieste, a Habsburg possession from the 14th century to 1918
 Province of Trieste, a province in the Friuli-Venezia Giulia Region of Italy

Military
 Trieste (bathyscaphe), a 1953 deep-sea submersible
 Trieste II (Bathyscaphe)
 101st Motorized Division "Trieste", an infantry division of Italy during World War II
 Italian cruiser Trieste, a WWII Italian heavy cruiser
 Italian landing helicopter dock Trieste, a future multipurpose amphibious unit for the Italian Navy

Other
 Trieste (film), a 1951 Yugoslav drama film
 Leopoldo Trieste (1917–2003), Italian actor, film director and screenwriter

See also

 
 Istria (disambiguation)
 Triste (disambiguation)